Tyresta National Park is a national park with a surrounding nature reserve in Sweden, located in Haninge and Tyresö municipalities in Stockholm County.

Geography 
About  from central Stockholm are the Tyresta National Park and Nature Reserve. The area is characterised by a rift valley landscape which is typical for central Sweden but unique in an international perspective. It has been protected to preserve its noted natural values, e.g. one of the largest sections of untouched forest in southern Sweden, and to safeguard its importance for recreation.

Lakes and dams 
The following lakes and dams are located within Tyresta National Park:
Bylsjön
Lanan
Långsjön
Mörtsjön
Nedre dammen
Stensjön
Trehörningen
Årsjön

Plants and animals 
The park and reserve are notable for containing one of the largest coniferous old-growth forests in southern Sweden, with some parts of the forest containing pine trees up to 400 years old.

The park also has deciduous broadleaf forests, open arable land and historical buildings of cultural interest. A typical feature of primeval forest is the great number of plant and animal species. Up to 8,000 species of animals can be found here which is four times as many as in managed forests. Many species are also completely dependent on primeval forest as their habitats and can not survive under other conditions.

Fire 
In August 1999, about 10% of the national park area was consumed in a fire. The hot and dry conditions in the area at the time were optimal for a forest fire to start.

Gallery

References

External links 

 Sweden's National Parks: Tyresta National Park from the Swedish Environmental Protection Agency
Tyresta National Park and Nature Reserve

National parks of Sweden
Haninge Municipality
Tyresö Municipality
Protected areas established in 1993
1993 establishments in Sweden
Geography of Stockholm County
Tourist attractions in Stockholm County